Lost & Found is the third studio album by American singer Ledisi. It was released by Verve Records August 28, 2007 in the United States. The album marked Ledisi's major-label debut after releasing two independent albums with her producing partner and keyboardist Sundra Manning on their label LeSun Records. In comparison to Ledisi's previous works Soulsinger: The Revival (1999), an album of original R&B and neo soul-oriented songs, and Feeling Orange but Sometimes Blue (2002), a set of jazz standards and originals, Lost & Found features a slicker production and calmer vocals. The album charted at number 78 on the US Billboard 200 and at number 10 on the Top R&B/Hip-Hop Albums chart.

Critical response

The album was rated 4.5 of 5 stars by AllMusic. Dan Quellette of Billboard stated, "During the last decade, Ledisi has consistently wowed audiences in tiny clubs and concert halls, which raises two questions: First, why did a major take so long to sign her; second, would her in-person effervescence translate to disc? On her Verve Forecast debut and third CD overall, Ledisi dispels any doubts with 15 R&B originals that showcase her prowess as a powerhouse vocalist as well as her songwriting maturity. The CD opens and closes with Ledisi live on the funky "Been Here," between which she gets soulfully cool, upbeat grooving and ecstatically unrestrained. Highlights include the spanking-beat "Today," the smoothly lyrical "Get to Know You," the scat-charged "Upside Down" and the album's balladic gem, "Lost and Found (Find Me)." — Dan Quellette

Commercial performance
Ledisi stated that she was unsure of wanting to stay within the music industry. In response, Ledisi wrote the song "Alright" to express her life. "Alright" became the lead single and debuted at number 45 on the US Billboard Hot R&B chart. The album's second single "In The Morning" debuted at number 49 on the Billboard Hot R&B chart. Other songs from the album charted but were not released as singles. "Think of You" charted at number 71 on the Hot R&B chart, "Joy" charted at number 103 on the Hot R&B chart and number 29 on the Adult R&B Airplay.

Track listing

Personnel
Adapted from the Lost & Found liner notes.

Instruments

 Errol Cooney – guitar (on "You and Me", "Best Friend", "Today" and "I Tried")
 Darrell Crooks – guitar (on "Think of You" and "In the Morning")
 John "Jubu" Smith – guitar
 Alvin White – guitar (on "Get to Know You")
 Nelson Braxton – bass (on "Upside Down")
 Melvin Davis – bass
 Dwayne "Smitty" Smith – bass
 Maurice Fitzgerald – live bass (on "Best Friend" and "Today")
 LaDell Abrams – drums (on "Best Friend")
 Tommie Bradford – drums (on "Upside Down")
 Felix "D-Kat" Pollard – drums (on "Someday")
 John "Lil John" Roberts – drums (on "Think of You" and "We Are One")

 Michael White – drums
 Lorenzo Johnson – drum programming (on "Get to Know You")
 Sundra Manning – drum programming, organ, keyboards, clavinet (on "Upside Down")
 Javier Solis – percussion (on "Best Friend")
 Luther "Mano" Hanes – keyboards, drum programming, key bass
 Rex Rideout – keyboards
 Phillip Lassiter – horns (on "Today")
 Kenneth "KC" Knight – organ (on "You and Me")
 Brandon Fields – saxophone (on "Been Here (Outro)")
 Nicholas Lane – trombone (on "Been Here (Outro)")
 Lee Thornburg – trumpet (on "Been Here (Outro)")
 DJ Rocky Rock – scratching (on "Think of You")

Production
 Ray Bardani – mixing at Glenwood Place and Encore Studios (Burbank, CA)
 John Jaszcz – mixing at The Bennett House (Franklin, TN)
 Bob Powers – mixing at Shelter Island, New York
 Grant Greene – assistant engineer
 Herb Powers, Jr – mastering

Artwork
 Cori Pillows – cover design
 Hollis King – package art direction
 Sachico Asano – package design
 Vincent Soyez – photography

Charts

Weekly charts

Year-end charts

References

External links
 Lost & Found at Discogs

2007 albums
Ledisi albums
Verve Forecast Records albums